Phillips (formerly, Phillip's and Vade Post Office) is a small unincorporated community in El Dorado County, California. It is the site of the Sierra-at-Tahoe ski resort. The ZIP code is 95720. The community is inside area code 530.

Joseph Wells Davis Phillips began cattle ranching here in 1859, and opened a hotel in 1863. The Vade post office operated at Phillips from 1912 to 1961.

References

Unincorporated communities in California
Unincorporated communities in El Dorado County, California
Populated places established in 1863